Pierre Augustin Moncousu (August 1756 – 6 July 1801) was a French naval officer.

Career
Moncousu was born in Baugé.  He took part in the Battle of Groix commanding Redoutable, and died at the First Battle of Algeciras.

Family
Moncousu's first-born son was also named Pierre-Augustin, and served in the Navy as well. Ensign in 1815, he was expelled from the Navy after fomenting a plot with five other officers to ferry Napoléon from Rochefort to the United States.

Notes and references

Notes

References

Bibliography
 
 Fonds Marine. Campagnes (opérations ; divisions et stations navales ; missions diverses). Inventaire de la sous-série Marine BB4. Tome premier : BB4 1 à 482 (1790–1826) 

French military personnel of the French Revolutionary Wars
French naval commanders of the Napoleonic Wars
1801 deaths
French military personnel killed in the Napoleonic Wars
1756 births